The Bhoodan movement (Land Gift movement), also known as the Bloodless Revolution, was a voluntary land reform movement in India. It was initiated by Gandhian Vinoba Bhave in 1951 at Pochampally village, Pochampally. 

The Bhoodan movement attempted to persuade wealthy landowners to voluntarily give a percentage of their land to landless people. Philosophically, Bhave was influenced by Sarvodaya movement and Gram Swarajya.

Method 
Landless labourers were given the 
small plots that they could settle and grow their crops on. Bhoodan Acts were passed that stated that the beneficiary had no right to sell the land or use it for non-agricultural purposes or for forestry. For example, Section 25 of the Maharashtra State Bhoodan Act states that the beneficiary (who must be landless) should only use the land for subsistence cultivation. If the "owner" failed to cultivate the land for over a year or tried to use it for non-agriculture activities, the government would have the right to confiscate it.

Bhave wanted peasants to give up using bullocks, tractors or other machines for agricultural purposes. This was called rishi-kheti in Hindi.  He also wanted the people to give up using money in the form of kanchan-dan. The movement had the support of Congress. JP Narayan withdrew from active politics to join the Bhoodan movement in 1953.

History 
Bhave crossed India on foot to persuade landowners to give up a piece of their land. His first success came on 18 April 1951 at Pochampally village in Nalgonda district, Andhra Pradesh (now Telangana) which was the centre of communist activity. It was the culmination of the Telangana peasant movement. A violent struggle had been launched by peasants against the local landlords.

Movement organisers had arranged for Bhave to stay at Pochampally, a village of about 700 families, of whom two-thirds were landless. Bhave visited the Harijan colony. By early afternoon, villagers began to gather around him. Bhave asked, "If it is not possible to get land from the government, is there not something villagers themselves could do?"

Later, he donated an additional . He joined social reform. After him, the land donation movement continued under a Bhoodan trust movement with the help of his sons. The 7th Nizam of Hyderabad, Mir Osman Ali Khan also donated  of his personal land to the Bhoodan movement.

Other landowners including Raja Bahadur Giriwar Narayan Singh, C.B.E. and Raja of Ranka (Garhwa Jharkhand) donated a combined  acres to the Bhoodan initiative, the largest donation in India.

Maharaja Kamakhya Narain Singh Bahadur of Ramgarh Raj donated  of land to Vinoba Bhave and others under the Bihar Bhoodan Yagna Act, prior to the institution of the suit, making it the biggest donation from any king.

During Vinoba Bhave's Surajgarh visit, he was welcomed by headmaster Rambilas Sharma and other members. Sharma was instrumental in spreading the Bhoodan movement in Jhunjhunu district in the late 1950s and early 1960s.

The initial objective of the movement was to secure voluntary donations and distribute it to the landless but soon came to demand 1/6 of all private land. In 1952, the movement widened the concept of gramdan ("village in gift" or the donation of an entire village) and had started advocating common ownership of land. The first village to come under gramdan was Mangroth in Hamirpur district of Uttar Pradesh. The second and third gramdan took place in Orissa in 1955.

Legacy 
This movement developed into a village gift or gramdan movement and it was a part of a comprehensive movement for the establishment of a Sarvodaya society (the rise of all socio-economic-political order), both in and outside India.

By the 1960s, the movement had lost momentum. The Sarvodaya Samaj failed to build a mass movement that would generate pressure for social transformation. However, the movement made a significant contribution by creating moral ambivalence, putting pressure on landlords, creating conditions favorable to the landless.

References

Additional reading
 Bhoodan and the Landless, S. V. Khandewale and K. R. Nanekar, Popular Prakashan, 1973
 Bhoodan Movement in India: An Economic Assessment, Raghavendra Nath Misra, New Delhi: S. Chand and Company Pvt Ltd, 1972.
 Moved by Love, Vinoba Bhave, Paramdhan Prakashan, 1994.

External links
 Vinoba Bhave: Bhoodan Movement (Land Gift Movement) (online book) put

History of the Republic of India
Land management in India
1951 in India
Gandhism
Social history of India
Hindi words and phrases